The Lethal Legion is a team of fictional characters that appear in comic books published by Marvel Comics.

The first version of the Legion appears in The Avengers #78 (Jul. 1970); the second version in Avengers #164 (Oct. 1977); the third version in West Coast Avengers vol. 2, #1 (Oct. 1985); the fourth Avengers West Coast #98 (Sep. 1993) and the final version in the limited series Dark Reign: Lethal Legion #1 (Aug. 2009).  The teams were created by Roy Thomas and John Buscema; Jim Shooter and various artists; Steve Englehart and Al Milgrom; Roy Thomas and Tim Dzon; and Frank Tieri and various artists respectively.

Grim Reaper's Lethal Legion
Avengers #78–79 (Jul.–Aug. 1970)

 Grim Reaper: Madman with a hand replaced by a scythe that harbours powerful technology.
 Living Laser: An inventor of highly advanced lasers.
 Man-Ape: One of Wakanda's greatest warriors who performed a forbidden ritual that gave him superhuman strength.
 Power Man (Erik Josten): Gained superhuman strength and durability due to an ionic ray.
 Swordsman (Jacques Duquesne): A master swordsman with different weapons in his sword.

Count Nefaria's Lethal Legion
Avengers #164–166 (Oct.–Dec. 1977)

 Count Nefaria: A crime lord and one of the world's wealthiest men.
 Living Laser
 Power Man (Erik Josten)
 Whirlwind: A mutant who can rotate his body at superhuman speed.

Grim Reaper's second Lethal Legion
West Coast Avengers vol. 2, #1–2 (Oct.–Nov. 1985)

 Grim Reaper
 Black Talon: A voodoo sorcerer who can create and control zombies.
 Goliath (Erik Josten): A man who can grow up to 60 ft.
 Man-Ape
 Nekra: A death-spirit.
 Ultron: A powerful and intelligent robot.

Porcupine's Lethal Legion
Marvel Age Annual #1 (1985)

 Attuma: An Atlantean barbarian.
 Batroc the Leaper: A skilled French combatant.
 Beetle: An engineer who invented a battle suit that enables flight and has other functions.
 Black Tiger
 Kurr'fri: A member of the Saurians that Ms. Marvel had encountered.
 Gorilla-Man
 Piledriver
 Porcupine: A criminal with a battle suit based on a porcupine.
 Sabretooth: A beast-like mutant.
 Thundra: A super-strong woman.
 Trapster: A criminal skilled with adhesives.
 Unicorn
 Whirlwind
 Wrecker: A criminal with an enchanted crowbar giving him superhuman strength.

Satannish's Lethal Legion
Avengers West Coast #98–100 (Sep.–Nov. 1993)

 Hangman (Jason Roland) 
 Axe of Violence: A demonically-enhanced Lizzie Borden with an axe replacing one hand.
 Coldsteel: A demonically-enhanced Josef Stalin, now an 8 ft. giant with superhuman strength.
 Cyana: A demonically-enhanced Lucrezia Borgia with poisoned claws.
 Zyklon: A demonically-enhanced Heinrich Himmler who can belch deadly gas fumes from his mouth.

Grim Reaper's third Lethal Legion
Dark Reign: Lethal Legion #1–3 (June–Aug. 2009)

 Grim Reaper
 Nekra
 Absorbing Man: A thug who was given a potion enabling him to absorb the properties of whatever he touched.
 Grey Gargoyle: A French chemist who can turn people to stone for an hour by touching them.
 Tiger Shark: A criminal with the DNA of a shark.
 Mister Hyde: A scientist who developed a formula that gives him superhuman strength.
 Wonder Man: Given superhuman strength and durability by an ionic ray.

Grandmaster's Lethal Legion
Avengers #676 (Jan. 2018)

 Blood Brothers: Two Roclites.
 Captain Glory: A Kree who was a captain in the Kree Armada.
 Drall: An Endrionic gladiator.
 Mentacle: A Rigellian with four tentacles for legs who has psychic abilities.
 Metal Master II: An Astran who admired the works of his predecessor.
 The Other: An unspecified alien.

Count Nefaria's second Lethal Legion
Amazing Spider-Man Vol. 5 #41 (March 2020)

 Count Nefaria
 Grey Gargoyle
 Living Laser
 Whirlwind

Other media

The Super Hero Squad Show version
The following are members of the Lethal Legion in The Super Hero Squad Show and its related media:

 Doctor Doom (leader)
 Abomination
 Absorbing Man
 AIM Agents
 Baron Mordo
 Batroc the Leaper
 The Blob
 Crimson Dynamo
 Doctor Octopus
 Doombots
 Dormammu
 Egghead
 Enchantress
 Fin Fang Foom
 Grogg
 Groot
 Impossible Man
 Juggernaut 
 Klaw
 Loki
 Magneto
 Manoo
 Megataur
 Melter
 MODOK
 Mole Man
 Molecule Man
 Moloids
 Mystique
 Plantman
 Pyro
 Quasimodo 
 Red Skull
 Ringmaster
 Sabertooth
 Screaming Mimi
 Sentinels 
 Stilt Man
 Super-Skrull
 Skurge
 Tiger Shark
 Titanium Man
 Toad
 Trapster
 Tricephalous
 Volcana
 Whiplash
 Whirlwind
 Wrecking Crew
 Bulldozer
 Piledriver
 Thunderball
 The Wrecker
 X the Unknownable
 Ymir
 Zzzax

Lethal Legion